Staunton Mall was a shopping mall in Augusta County, Virginia, United States. It was slightly outside the city limits of Staunton, Virginia. Opened in 1968 as Staunton Plaza, it originally featured J. C. Penney, Montgomery Ward, Woolworth, and Safeway as its major stores. An expansion plan between 1985 and 1987 enclosed the formerly open-air property while adding Leggett (now Belk) as a third department store and renaming the property to Staunton Mall. The mall underwent a number of anchor store changes throughout the late 1980s and early 1990s: Safeway became an outlet store for Sears, then Goody's and Gold's Gym, while Woolworth was converted to Stone & Thomas and then to Peebles, and Montgomery Ward became Steve & Barry's. The mall lost many inline stores throughout the 21st century, and passed through several owners before closing on January 1, 2021.

History 
Construction of Staunton Plaza began in 1966. The first tenant to open was a Montgomery Ward department store, which opened for business in September 1968, followed by a Safeway supermarket one month later. Other major tenants of the original center included J. C. Penney, Woolworth, and Peoples Drug. J. C. Penney opened for business in April 1969, following a fire at their previous location in Staunton three months prior. The Staunton Plaza location was the chain's 21st in the state of Virginia.

Safeway closed both its Staunton Plaza store, and a second in nearby Waynesboro, Virginia, in late 1982 after members of the United Food and Commercial Workers entered a labor dispute with the chain, combined with increased competition from another non-union supermarket that had locations in both towns. In 1984, their space at the mall was sold to Sears, which operated it as an outlet store specializing in overstocked merchandise from other Sears stores and catalog merchants.

As Staunton Mall
Covington Co., which owned the plaza at the time, announced renovation plans in 1986. Included in the expansion was a third department store anchor, the South Boston, Virginia-based Leggett, which opened for business in February 1987. Leggett had operated a store in Staunton since the 1930s. Once renovations were complete, the property was officially renamed Staunton Mall.

Despite these renovations, two major stores at the mall closed soon afterward. First was the Sears outlet store, which was shuttered in 1989 due to declining sales. The space became a Goody's clothing store in October 1993. Also in October 1993, the Woolworth company announced that the Staunton Mall store would be closed by January 1994 as part of a company-wide restructuring that involved renovation or closure of older stores.

In 1996, Staunton Mall underwent a renovation plan by then-owners Steven D. Bell and Co. Under these plans, the food court was moved closer to the theater, with the previous one, added in the 1986-87 renovations, becoming additional mall space. Also, a fountain was removed in center court, the mall exterior was repainted and received new canopies, and Stone & Thomas opened in the vacated Woolworth.

The mall was purchased by Colonial Properties Trust in 1998 and renamed Colonial Mall Staunton, just as the Stone & Thomas store was closed and sold to Peebles, and the Leggett store was renamed Belk. Following Colonial Properties Trust's purchase of the mall, the Montgomery Ward anchor was vacated in early 2001 as that chain went out of business. Colonial Properties underwent negotiations with several chains to replace the vacated anchor, including Target, Sears, and Old Navy. This space became Steve & Barry's in 2004. Gold's Gym joined the mall in 2006, replacing the Goody's store after that chain decided not to renew its lease.

The mall was sold again in 2007 to First Republic Group Realty, which returned the mall's name to Staunton Mall. Under their ownership, the Steve & Barry's store vacated, while Books-A-Million moved to a larger store in Waynesboro. After First Republic filed for bankruptcy in 2009, it was sold again to the Kohan Retail Investment Group and in 2014 to Staunton Mall LLC. Another anchor store in the mall became vacant when Peebles closed in March 2018. The mall was sold again in 2020, with it being announced on November 24, 2020, that all remaining tenants (except Belk) will vacate the property in thirty days.

On June 4, 2020, JCPenney announced that it would be closing by around October 2020 as part of a plan to close 154 stores nationwide. By 2021, Belk was the only remaining store and plans for demolition were announced by the mall's then-owners. 

In March 2022, demolition process began with the J. C. Penney anchor store torn down.

References 

Shopping malls in Virginia
Buildings and structures in Augusta County, Virginia
Defunct shopping malls in the United States
Demolished shopping malls in the United States
Shopping malls established in 1968
1968 establishments in Virginia
Shopping malls disestablished in 2020
2020 disestablishments in Virginia
Buildings and structures demolished in 2022